Henry Swearingen (ca. 1792–1849) was a U.S. Representative from Ohio.

Born in the Northern Panhandle of Virginia (now West Virginia), Swearingen moved to Ohio and settled near Steubenville. He served as Sheriff of Jefferson County, Ohio during 1824–1828 and 1830–1832.

Swearingen was elected as a Democrat to the Twenty-fifth Congress to fill the vacancy caused by the resignation of Daniel Kilgore.
He was reelected to the Twenty-sixth Congress and served from December 3, 1838, to March 4, 1841.
He died on board ship while en route to his home from the State of California and was buried at sea.

Sources

1790s births
1849 deaths
Politicians from Steubenville, Ohio
People who died at sea
Burials at sea
Year of birth unknown
Ohio sheriffs
Democratic Party members of the United States House of Representatives from Ohio
19th-century American politicians
People from West Virginia